Gail Pellerin (born May 31, 1962) is an American politician who is a member of the California State Assembly from 28th district. The district includes most of Santa Cruz County and part of Santa Clara County. She previously served as Santa Cruz County Clerk from 1993 until her resignation in 2020.

Electoral history

References 

1962 births
Living people
Democratic Party members of the California State Assembly